Harry Hockings (born 28 July 1998) is an Australian rugby union player He currently plays for Suntory Sungoliath in Japan's domestic Top League. .  His position of choice is lock.

References 

Australian rugby union players
1998 births
Living people
Rugby union locks
Queensland Country (NRC team) players
Queensland Reds players
Tokyo Sungoliath players
Rugby union players from Queensland